Dennis Jürgensen (born 3 February 1961) is one of the most popular Danish writers for kids and young adults. A study among Danish kids from 11 to 18 years showed that 90% knew who Jürgensen was and the fanclub got many members.

Writing style
Jürgensen is mostly a writer for the youth but as he has said himself some of his books should be considered to be for adults. He has written in almost any genre but his most preferred genres are fantasy, science fiction and horror or a combination of those three. But he has also written crime-books, books about love and realistic novels.

Humor is an ongoing feature, a thing he focuses a lot on. One of his idols, Stephen King, once said his biggest wish was that someone would die of terror after reading his book. To that Jürgensen has remarked that his biggest wish is that someone will laugh so hard from reading his book that people in the bus will turn around and look at him.

Personal life and career
He grew up in Brønshøj near Copenhagen (today he's living in Rødovre), he was doing okay in school with the exception being Danish. He drifted around after taking his exam in 1978 and tried unsuccessfully to send manuscripts to various publishers. But during the summer of 1981 Kristian Tellerup from the publishing company Tellerup answered to one of his scripts, Love at First Hiccup, a youth-novel about love and of course a lot humor. It was published the same autumn and was an enormous success and has since been reprinted 20 times. It was later put to the screen in 1999 and became a big success in Denmark. Since then he has written more than 50 novels and made three feature films, for example an adaptation of his Kærlighed ved første hik, starring Robert Hansen and Sofie Lassen-Kahlke.

Jürgensen doesn't often make appearances on mainstream media. However, on 22 August 2014 he was guest on the radio programme Syvkabalen on national radio Radio24Syv, where he openly elaborated on his work as an author and motivations.

Bibliography 
These are the Danish titles of the books that have been printed.

Kærlighed ved første hik (1981)
Er du blød mand (1982)
Balladen om den forsvundne mumie (1982)
Brædder til Draculas kiste (1983)
Djævelens hule (1983)
Bøvsedragens hemmelighed (1984)
Jord i hovedet (1984)
Grønne øjne (1985)
Blodspor i Transsylvanien (1986)
Flyskræk (1986)
Gargoylens gåde (1986)
Stormesteren (1987)
Bøvl med bandagerne (1988)
Knusumkranium (Krøniker fra kvæhl 1) (1988)
Vampyrtroldene (Krøniker fra kvæhl 2) (1988)
Æzurvin slår til (Krøniker fra kvæhl 3) (1988)
Midnatstimen (1989)
Dystopia (1989)
Heksens ansigt (Krøniker fra kvæhl 4) (1990)
Lusingandos fælde (Krøniker fra kvæhl 5) (1990)
Jeg, en nørd (1990)
Snevampyren (1991)
Sorte Ragn rider igen (1991)
Kadavermarch (1991)
Tingen i cellen (1992)
Mirakler udføres (1992)
Benny og Brian med ketchup og sennep (1993)
Monstret i kælderen (1993)
Relief (1993)
Måske (1994)
Ikke en fjer bedre (1995)
Sidste time (1995)
Mørkeleg (1996)
Benny og Brian møder den sorte julemand (1996)
De hængte mænds hus (1997)
Et grimm’t eventyr (1997)
Uhyret i brønden (1998)
Gylperen (1999)
Hår(d) (1999)
Maskiner sanser ikke hud (Machines don't Sense Skin) (2000)
De kom fra blodsumpen 2 (with Patrick Leis) (They Came from the Blood Swamp 2) (2001)
Evighedens port (Drømmetjenerne 1) (Gate of Eternity, The Dream Waiters 1) (2002)
Mandators Kappe (Drømmetjenerne 2) (The Cape of Mandators, The Dream Waiters 2) (2004)
Ondskabens Dimension (Drømmetjenerne 3) (The Dimension of Evil, The Dream Waiters 3) (2005)
Den Gyldne By (Drømmetjenerne 4) (The Golden City, The Dream Waiters 4) (2006)
Kadaverjagt (Hunting Corpses) (2006)
Sagen om de japanske dræbergardiner (Spøgelseslinien 1) (The case of the Japanese Killer Curtains, Ghost Hotline 1) (2003)
Sagen om det blodige vampyrtrick (Spøgelseslinien 2) (The case of the Bloody Vampire Trick, Ghost Hotline 2) (2004)
Sagen om Ugledrengens afklippede klo (Spøgelseslinien 3) (The case of the Owl Boy's Cut Off Hook, Ghost Hotline 3) (2007)
Dæmonen i hælene (Daemon by the Heels) (2007)
Sagen om det galoperende maleri (Spøgelseslinien 4) (The case of the Galloping Painting, Ghost Hotline 4) (2008)
Sagen om den brændende klovn (Spøgelseslinien 5) (The case of the Burning Clown, Ghost Hotline 5) (2008)
Tunnelmanden (The Tunnel Man) (2010)
Kælderkrigerne (The Cellar Warriors) (2010)
Løbende Tjener (Running Waiter) (2014)

Books about Dennis Jürgensen
Drager, damer & dæmoner - en guide til Dennis Jürgensens univers, M. F. Clasen, Tellerup, 2002

See also

 Anders Westenholz, another Danish writer of fantasy and other fantastic literature.

References

External links
 The homepage of the publishing company Tellerup
 The official fan club

1961 births
Living people
Danish children's writers
People from Rødovre